Croatia has competed at every celebration of the Mediterranean Games since the 1993 Mediterranean Games. As of 2022, Croatian athletes have won a total of 205 medals.

Medal count

Multiple medal winners
The following list only contains medal winners for Croatia as an independent country.

List of flag bearers

See also
 Croatia at the Olympics
 Croatia at the Paralympics

References

External links
 Medals Table per Country at CIJM web site
  of the Croatian Olympic Committee